Christopher Ryan Rowley (born August 14, 1990) is an American former professional baseball pitcher. He played in Major League Baseball (MLB) for the Toronto Blue Jays. He is also a first lieutenant in the United States Army, assigned to the Individual Ready Reserve (IRR). Upon his major-league debut in August 2017, Rowley became the first West Point graduate to play in MLB.

High school and college
Rowley attended South Forsyth High School in Cumming, Georgia, where he set school records in wins, earned run average (ERA), and strikeouts. After high school, Rowley was offered college baseball scholarships by Mercer University and the United States Military Academy (also called West Point). He chose the Military Academy over Mercer, as the Army Black Knights offered him a chance to start games, while the Mercer Bears wanted him in the bullpen, working as a relief pitcher. In his first season with Army, he appeared in three games for the Black Knights and posted a 13.00 ERA in nine innings pitched. The following year, Rowley pitched to a 5–4 win–loss record, 4.68 ERA, and 54 strikeouts in 73 total innings. Rowley finished the 2012 campaign with an 11–1 record, which included six complete games and five shutouts, and added a 2.40 earned run average and 80 strikeouts in 97 innings. Following the season, he was named the Patriot League's Pitcher of the Year. In his final season with the Black Knights, Rowley went 9–4 with a 2.67 ERA and 75 strikeouts in 97 innings pitched.

Professional career

Toronto Blue Jays

Minor leagues and military

Undrafted after graduation, Rowley was invited by the Toronto Blue Jays to play for the Gulf Coast League Blue Jays for the remainder of the 2013 season, after which he would begin his five-year active duty obligation to the United States Army. In nine games played, he pitched to a 4–0 record, 1.10 ERA, and 39 strikeouts in 32 innings. Rowley began his military service assigned to Fort Sill, Oklahoma, and was later assigned to Bulgaria and Romania as a Field Artillery fire support officer. While assigned to Bulgaria for Operation Atlantic Resolve, first lieutenant Rowley pitched to his company's senior medic to keep his arm in shape. After serving 30 months in the military, Rowley's application for an exception to the remainder of his commitment was approved on January 22, 2016, and he was assigned to Individual Ready Reserve. He played the entire year with the Advanced-A Dunedin Blue Jays, and posted a 10–3 win–loss record, 3.49 ERA, and 86 strikeouts in a career-high 123 innings. He was assigned to the Double-A New Hampshire Fisher Cats to begin the 2017 season, and earned a promotion to the Triple-A Buffalo Bisons on June 19. Rowley initially pitched out of the bullpen for Buffalo, and joined the starting rotation on July 4.

Major leagues
On August 12, 2017, Rowley was called up from Triple-A Buffalo to start against the Pittsburgh Pirates. He pitched 5 innings and allowed a single run on five hits and one walk with three strikeouts, and earned the win in the 7–2 victory. In his rookie season, Rowley recorded a 6.75 ERA and 1–2 record in 6 games. Rowley was outrighted off the 40-man roster on November 20, 2017. On January 24, 2018, the Blue Jays invited him to spring training as a non-roster invitee. He did not make the club and was assigned to Triple-A Buffalo to begin the year. Rowley was added to the active roster on July 14, 2018. In two games for Toronto in 2018, Rowley allowed four runs in  innings pitched.

Texas Rangers
On July 23, 2018, Rowley was claimed off waivers by the Texas Rangers. He spent the remainder of the season with the Triple-A Round Rock Express, logging a 2–3 record and 3.46 ERA in 7 games. On September 10, Rowley was outrighted off of the 40-man roster. He declared free agency on October 5, 2018.

San Diego Padres
On February 28, 2019, Rowley signed a minor league contract with the San Diego Padres organization. He was assigned to the Triple-A El Paso Chihuahuas, where he pitched to a 11.02 ERA in 16.1 innings of work, missing much of the year due to injury. He became a free agent following the 2019 season.

Minnesota Twins
On January 28, 2020, Rowley signed a minor league contract with the Minnesota Twins organization. Rowley did not play in a game in 2020 due to the cancellation of the minor league season because of the COVID-19 pandemic. He became a free agent on November 2, 2020.

References

External links

1990 births
Living people
American expatriate baseball players in Canada
Army Black Knights baseball players
Baseball players from Atlanta
Buffalo Bisons (minor league) players
Dunedin Blue Jays players
El Paso Chihuahuas players
Gulf Coast Blue Jays players
Major League Baseball pitchers
New Hampshire Fisher Cats players
Round Rock Express players
Toronto Blue Jays players
United States Army officers
United States Military Academy alumni